Vladimir II Monomakh (Old East Slavic: Володимѣръ Мономахъ, Volodiměrŭ Monomakhŭ; ; ; Christian name: Vasiliy, Vasyl, or Basileios) (26 May 1053 – 19 May 1125) reigned as Grand Prince of the Medieval Rus' from 1113 to 1125. He is considered a saint in the Eastern Orthodox Church and is celebrated on May 6.

Family 
He was the son of Vsevolod I (married in 1046) and a relative of Byzantine emperor Constantine IX Monomachos, from whom Vladimir obtained his sobriquet. Contemporary Byzantine naming practice allowed the adoption of a maternal surname if the mother's family was perceived to be of a more exalted origin than that of the father.

Reign 

In his famous Instruction (also known as The Testament) to his own children, Monomakh mentions that he conducted 83 military campaigns and 19 times made peace with the Polovtsi. At first he waged war against the steppe jointly with his cousin Oleg, but after Vladimir was sent by his father to rule Chernigov and Oleg made peace with the Polovtsi to retake that city from him, they parted company. Since that time, Vladimir and Oleg were bitter enemies who would often engage in internecine wars. The enmity continued among their children and more distant posterity.

In 1068 he allied with the Cuman chief Bilge-Tegin.
From 1094, his chief patrimony was the southern town of Pereiaslav, although he also controlled Rostov, Suzdal, and other northern provinces (see Principality of Pereyaslavl). In these lands he founded several towns, notably his namesake, Vladimir, the future capital of Russia. In order to unite the princes of Rus' in their struggle against the Great Steppe, Vladimir initiated three princely congresses, the most important being held at Lyubech in 1097 and Dolobsk in 1103.

In 1107 he defeated Boniak, a Cuman khan who led an invasion on Kievan Rus'. When Sviatopolk II died in 1113, the Kievan populace revolted and summoned Vladimir to the capital. The same year he entered Kiev to the great delight of the crowd and reigned there until his death in 1125. As may be seen from his Instruction, he promulgated a number of reforms in order to allay the social tensions in the capital. These years saw the last flowering of Ancient Rus, which was torn apart 10 years after his death.

Vladimir Monomakh is buried in the Saint Sophia Cathedral in Kyiv. Succeeding generations often referred to his reign as the golden age of that city. Numerous legends are connected with Monomakh's name, including the transfer from Constantinople to Rus of such precious relics as the Theotokos of Vladimir and the Vladimir/Muscovite crown called Monomakh's Cap.

Marriages and children 
Vladimir married three times. The 13th-century chronicler Saxo Grammaticus reported that, in what would have been his first marriage, Vladimir wed Gytha of Wessex, daughter of Harold, King of England, who had fallen at Hastings in 1066 and of Edith Swannesha. This marriage is not reported by any contemporary sources, and none of the Russian sources report the name or parentage of Vladimir's first wife. The "Testament of Vladimir Monomakh" records the death of the mother of Vladimir's son Yuri on 7 May 1107, but it does not mention her name. Most historians agree it was more likely Yuri's mother was Gytha, based upon Yuri's acceptable marriage age in 1108.

They had at least the following children:

 Mstislav I of Kiev (1 June 1076 – 14 April 1132)
 Izyaslav Vladimirovich, Prince of Kursk (c. 1077 – 6 September 1096)
 Svyatoslav Vladimirovich, Prince of Smolensk and Pereyaslav (c. 1080 – 16 March 1114)
 Yaropolk II of Kiev (1082 – 18 February 1139)
 Viacheslav I of Kiev (1083 – 2 February 1154)

A daughter has been attributed to either the first or the second wife:
 Marina Vladimirovna (d. 1146). Married Leon Diogenes, a pretender to the throne of the Byzantine Empire who claimed to be a son of Romanos IV and who rose to the rank of khan of the Cumans in Ossetia.

Vladimir's second wife, Eufimia, is considered to have been a Byzantine noblewoman.  This marriage produced at least five children:
 Roman, Prince of Volhynia (d. 6 January 1119)
 Euphemia of Kiev (d. 4 April 1139). Married Coloman of Hungary.
 Agafia (Agatha). Married Vsevolod Davidovich, Prince of Gorodno. According to older historians her husband was a son of David Igorevich, Prince of Volhynia (d. 1113), but this theory was rejected.
 Yuri (George), later known as Yuri Dolgoruki (d. 15 May 1157).
 Andrew, Prince of Volhynia (11 July 1102 – 1141).

Vladimir's third marriage is thought to have been to a daughter of Aepa Ocenevich, Khan of the Cumans. Her paternal grandfather was Osen. Her people belonged to the Kipchaks, a confederation of pastoralists and warriors of Turkic origin.

However the Primary Chronicle identifies Aepa as father-in-law to Yuri Dolgoruki, with Vladimir negotiating the marriage in name of his son. Whether father and son married sisters or the identity of intended groom was misidentified remains unclear.

See also
 Black Sea
 Council of Liubech
 List of Russian rulers
 List of Ukrainian rulers

References

Sources

Further reading

External links 
 Arkadii Zhukovsky, Volodymyr Monomakh in the Internet Encyclopedia of Ukraine, vol. 5 (1993)
 English biography
 Karamzin's account of Monomakh
 Instruction of Vladimir Monomakh
 The Pouchenie of Vladimir Monomakh www.dur.ac.uk
 (Russian) The Pouchenie of Vladimir Monomakh monomah.vladimir.ru

Princes of Rostov
Princes of Chernigov
Princes of Pereyaslavl
Grand Princes of Kiev
1053 births
1125 deaths
Rurik dynasty
Burials at Saint Sophia Cathedral, Kyiv
11th-century princes in Kievan Rus'
12th-century princes in Kievan Rus'
Eastern Orthodox monarchs